Scythris cooperi is a moth of the family Scythrididae. It was described by Bengt Å. Bengtsson in 2014. It is found in Eastern Cape, South Africa.

References

Endemic moths of South Africa
cooperi
Moths described in 2014